Vasco António Barbosa da Costa (born 8 August 1991 in Ponte de Lima, Viana do Castelo District) is a Portuguese professional footballer who plays for A.D. Os Limianos as a forward.

References

External links

Portuguese League profile 

1991 births
Living people
People from Ponte de Lima
Sportspeople from Viana do Castelo District
Portuguese footballers
Association football forwards
Primeira Liga players
Liga Portugal 2 players
Segunda Divisão players
AD Fafe players
Vitória F.C. players
F.C. Famalicão players
A.R. São Martinho players